Bedeni, also known as Arup Kotha (1951–52), is an unfinished Bengali language film directed by legendary filmmaker Ritwik Ghatak. This was the first movie in which Ritwik worked as a director.

Making
The film was based on a short story of Tarashankar Bandopadhyay named Nagini. In 1950 when the shooting started the director of this movie was Nirmal Dey. The shooting of the film was arranged in Rupashree studio, Park Circus, Kolkata. After the studio got devastated by fire in an accident, they started shooting in Indrapuri Studio. After some time, the shooting of the film had to be stopped mainly for financial problems. In 1951 Ritwik Ghatak was appointed as the director of this film. Ghatak made some changes in the storyline, rewrote screenplay and renamed the film Arup Kotha.
In 1952 the film unit shot for 20 days in Bolpur and Ghatshila in the bank of river Subarnarekha. But, for some technical problem in the cameras used in the shooting the film did not expose. So, the film was abandoned.

Cast and crew

Cast
Shobha Sen as Pingala
Bijon Bhattacharya
Keshto Mukherjee
Ketaki Dutta as Chiti
Mita Chaterjee as Gokhri
Prabha Debi as Shapla
Abhi Bhatacharya as Dhona
Maharshi Manoranjan Bhattacharya as Sardar
Mumtaz Ahmed Khan
Parijat Bose

Crew
Production: Sunil Krishna Roy.
Direction and screenplay: Ritwik Ghatak.
Story: Tarashankar Bandopadhyay.
Cinematography: Sachin Dasgupta.

References

Bengali-language Indian films
1950s unfinished films
Films directed by Ritwik Ghatak
Films based on works by Tarasankar Bandyopadhyay